The evolution of tectonophysics is closely linked to the history of the continental drift and plate tectonics hypotheses. The continental drift/ Airy-Heiskanen isostasy hypothesis had many flaws and scarce data. The fixist/ Pratt-Hayford isostasy, the contracting Earth and the expanding Earth concepts had many flaws as well.

The idea of continents with a permanent location, the geosyncline theory, the Pratt-Hayford isostasy, the extrapolation of the age of the Earth by Lord Kelvin as a black body cooling down, the contracting Earth, the Earth as a solid and crystalline body, is one school of thought. A lithosphere creeping over the asthenosphere is a logical consequence of an Earth with internal heat by radioactivity decay, the Airy-Heiskanen isostasy, thrust faults and Niskanen's mantle viscosity determinations.

Making sense of the puzzle pieces 

 1953, the Great Global Rift, running along the Mid-Atlantic Ridge, was discovered by Bruce Heezen (Lamont Group) (Puzzle pieces: Seismic-refraction and Sonar survey of the rifts).
 Their world ocean floor map was published 1977. Austrian painter Heinrich Berann worked on it.
 Nowadays the seafloor maps have a better resolution by the SEASAT, Geosat/ERM and ERS-1/ERM (European Remote-Sensing Satellite/Exact Repeat Mission) missions. 
 World map of earthquake epicenters, oceanic ones mainly .
 1954–1963: Alfred Rittmann was elected IAV President (IAV at that time) for three periods.
 1956, S. K. Runcorn becomes a drifter. , 
 Statistics by Ronald Fisher. , 
 Jan Hospers work (magnetic poles and geographical poles coincide the last 23 Ma).
 Self-exciting dynamo theory of Elsasser-Bullard.
 S. W. Carey, plate tectonics . But he believed here in an Expanding Earth.
 1958, Henry William Menard notes that most mid-ocean ridges are halfway between the two continental edges ( cited in ).
 Seafloor spreading
 December 1960, Harry H. Hess (preprint and a report for the Navy): Sonar and seafloor spreading (personal communication formally published in 1962 (Puzzle pieces: his World War II seafloor profiles,  and the Great Global Rift).
 1961, Robert S. Dietz .
 , the Permian tillite at Squantum, Massachusetts, was reclassified as turbidite. It was used as argument by anti-drifters.
 P. M. S. Blakett (1960), Blakett's former lecturer S. K. Runcorn (1962), Runcorn's former student E. Irving: Paleomagnetism.
 1962, S.K. Runcorn applies the Rayleigh's theory of convection: convection occurs if viscosity under the crust is less than 1026-1027 CGS units. 
 1962, Subduction in the Aleutian Islands, Robert R. Coats (USGS). 
 
 The uncertainty of the distance between Europe and North America is too great to confirm the continental drift hypothesis. It states wrongly that the lock-and-key form of South America and Africa is less good if the continental shelf is taken into account. Note: the truth is that neither A. Wegener nor C. Schuchert used the east coastline of South America and west coastline of Africa, really; these coastlines don't fit .

Plate tectonics 

 Publication of the Vine–Matthews–Morley hypothesis. , 
 Frederick Vine is working under Drummond Matthews, University of Cambridge.
 Lawrence W. Morley's independent paper was not accepted.
 John Tuzo Wilson, a former fixist/contractionist up to around 1959. 
 J. T. Wilson spends much of 1965 in Cambridge and Hess joined him in the second half. Wilson develops the transform fault concept.
 Wilson cycle, .
 Frederick Vine, applies the transform fault concept, the Vine–Matthews–Morley hypothesis and the seafloor spreading concept on the Juan de Fuca Ridge. He does not get a constant spreading rate as the Jaramillo reversal (Geomagnetic reversal) is unknown. 
 Wells, finds on growth rings of Devonian corals the maximum Earth expansion during this time to be less than 0.6 mm/year , . Heezen, abandons the expanding Earth theory as it requires a radial expansion of 4–8 mm/year for the Atlantic Ocean alone .
 1966, East South America and West Africa, rocks and their ages match where they were joint: South Africa / Santa de la Ventana, Argentina; Ghana / São Luís do Maranhão, Brazil.
 Nowadays, the fit between Africa and South America is based on paleomagnetism, slightly different from the older "Bullard's Fit" (based on least-square fitting of 500 fathom (c. 900 m) contours across the Atlantic). , 
 Closure:
 November 1965, Geological Society of America, Brent Dalrymple (Brent Dalrymple, Richard Doell and Allan V. Cox – USGS) brought to Frederik Vine attention that there is the Jaramillo "reversal" (publ. mid-1966 !!!). , 
 February 1966, Vine visits the Lamont group (Walt Pitman and Neil Opdyke) and tells them that their 'discovered' Emperor reversal was already named as Jaramillo reversal. And shows the reversal on the Walt Pitman's graphik (cm/ vertical), surprising Pitman, Opdyke and even himself , . Many anti-drifters changed their mind after the publication of these magnetometer readings of sediment core (Eltanin-19), geomagnetic reversals .
 The Vine–Matthews–Morley hypothesis is the first scientific test to confirm the seafloor spreading concept. Earth Sciences paradigm shift, from fix continents to plate tectonics :
 Magnetometer readings of sediment cores, geomagnetic reversals: ratio of cm (vertical).
 Magnetic profiles of seafloor, geomagnetic reversals: ratio of km (horizontal).
 Radiometric analysis of lava flows, geomagnetic reversals: ratio of Ma (time). 
 Conference in New York in November 1966, sponsored by NASA ( cited in ).
 Maurice Ewing to Edward Bullard: "You don't believe all this rubbish, do you, Teddy?"
 Even Maurice Ewing (Lamont–Doherty Earth Observatory) came to accept seafloor spreading by April 1967 and cited (along with his brother John Ewing) the case for Vine-Matthews-Morley Hypothesis as "strong support for the hypothesis of spreading. 
 
 Around 1967, Marshall Kay becomes a drifter. 
 In 1967, W. Jason Morgan proposed that the Earth's surface consists of 12 rigid plates that move relative to each other . Two months later, in 1968, Xavier Le Pichon published a complete model based on 6 major plates with their relative motions (received 2 January 1968). The Englishmen Dan McKenzie and Robert Parker published the quantitative principles for plate tectonics (Euler's rotation theorem: Individual aseismic areas move as rigid plates on the surface of a sphere, quote: "a block on a sphere can be moved to any other conceivable orientation by a single rotation about a properly chosen axis.") .
It is based on a presentation at the American Geophysical Union's 1967 meeting (title: Rises, Trenches, Great Faults, and Crustal Blocks).
 Note II: W. Jason Morgan shared with Fred Vine an office in the Princeton University for two years, and a scientific paper from H. W. Menard drifted his attention to plate tectonics.
 End of the continental drift controversy in the USA: North Atlantic – Geology and Continental Drift, a Symposium (1969); American Association of Petroleum Geologists (AAPG) ( cited in ).

Geodynamics 

 John F. Dewey applies Plate tectonics .
 Plate tectonics:
 Mantle plume controversy: The relationship between subducted seafloor, flood basalts and continental rifting is uncovered.
 Slab pull force, Slab suction force (Back-arc basin) and Ridge push force:
 Wilson cycle: slab pull/ subduction opens a space on western South America and the sliding seafloor away from the Mid-Atlantic Ridge on eastern South America occupies the new available space.
 Overview: viscous resistance, slab thickness, slab bending, trench migration and seismic coupling, slab width, slab edges and mantle return flow:
 
 
 
 Current plate motions.
 Pacific Plate, lower mantle has a greater viscosity 
 Tibetan Plateau, collision generates heat , 
 Paleogeography ( and ):
 Order Cycadales, genus Bowenia
 Family Araucariaceae found in Norfolk Island, Australia, Vanuatu, New Caledonia, Papua New Guinea, Indonesia, Malaysia, Philippines, New Guinea, Argentina, Chile, and southern Brazil. Coal fossils found on the British Isles.
 Magnolia, subgenus Magnolia:
 Section Magnolia, found in the Neotropical realm
 Section Gwillimia, found in Asia including Borneo
 Section Blumiana, found in Asia, including Sumatra and Borneo
 Section Talauma, found in the Neotropical realm
 Section Manglietia, found in Asia
 Section Kmeria, found in Asia
 Section Rhytidospermum, found in Asia and Magnolia tripetala (L.) L. in Southeast USA
 Section Auriculata, Magnolia fraseri Walt. found in Southeast USA
 Section Macrophylla, Magnolia macrophylla Michx. found in Southeast USA
 Magnolia, subgenus Yulania:
 Section Yulania, found in Asia and Magnolia acuminata (L.) L. found in East USA
 Section Michelia, found in Asia including the Indomalayan realm
 Note: a bee fossil of the genus Melittosphex, is considered "an extinct lineage of pollen-collecting Apoidea sister to the modern bees", and dates from the early Cretaceous (c. 100 Ma). Insect-pollinated flowering plants need bees (unranked taxon Anthophila, of the superfamily Apoidea). Beetles may have originated during the Lower Permian, up to 299 Ma. Flies evolved c. 250 Ma, moths and wasps evolved c. 150 Ma.
 
 Total estimated radiogenic heat release (from neutrino research): 19 Terawatts
 Total directly observed heat release through Earth's surface: 31 Terawatts
 Plate reconstruction: Torsvik, Trond Helge and Gaina, Carmen, Center for Geodynamics at NGU (Geological Survey of Norway), PGP (Physics of Geological Processes, University of Oslo, Norway); Müller, R. Dietmar, EarthByte Group, University of Sydney; Scotese, C.R., Ziegler, A.M. and Van der Voo, R., University of Michigan, University of Chicago and University of Texas, Arlington; Ziegler, P.A. and Stampfli, Gérard, University of Basel and University of Lausanne.
 Global plate reconstructions with velocity fields from 150 Ma to present in 10 Ma increments.

Overview 

Many concepts had to be changed:
 Uniformitarianism instead of catastrophism.
 Empirical science instead of creationism.
 Plutonism instead of neptunism, but hydrothermal secondary mineralization occurs.
 Seafloor of sima instead of sial.
 Baron Kelvin got the age of the Earth too short.
 The concept of Earth crust and mantle.
 Airy-Heiskanen isostasy model instead of the Pratt-Hayford model.
 Thrust faults had to be accepted.
 The expanding Earth and the contracting Earth concept had to be given up.

The shifting and evolution of knowledge and concepts, were from:
 Eduard Suess (alpine geology: theory of thrusting as a modification of the geosyncline hypothesis), ;
 then to Alfred Wegener (continental drift), ;
 then to Arthur Holmes (a model with convection), ;
 then to Felix Andries Vening Meinesz (gravity anomalies along the oceanic trenches implied that the crust was moving) and A. Rittmann (subduction), ;
 then to Samuel Warren Carey (plate tectonics), ; Harry Hammond Hess and Robert S. Dietz (seafloor spreading), ;
 then to John Tuzo Wilson (seafloor spreading), (transform faults),  and (Wilson cycle), ;
 then to Jason Morgan, Dan McKenzie and Robert Parker (quantification of plate tectonics), ; its uncertainty was quantified by Theodore C. Chang;

Actually, there were two main "schools of thought" that pushed plate tectonics forward:
 The "alternative concepts to e.g. Harold Jeffreys group", James Hutton, Eduard Suess, Alfred Wegener, Alexander du Toit, Arthur Holmes and Felix Andries Vening Meinesz (together with J.H.F. Umbgrove, B.G. Escher and Ph.H. Kuenen). Holmes, Vening Meinesz and Umbgrove had some experience in Burma or Indonesia (Pacific Ring of Fire).
With the theory of thrusting, nappes, thrust faults and subductions.
 The "Princeton University" group around H. H. Hess: Felix Andries Vening Meinesz, Harry Hammond Hess, John Tuzo Wilson, W. Jason Morgan and Frederick Vine. Overview of plate tectonics in: .
 Vening Meinesz (together with J.H.F. Umbgrove, B.G. Escher and Ph.H. Kuenen) had more evidence that the established paradigm and the reality do not match. But as all geophysicists he could not really believe in crust motions in such a large scale and he knew Wegener's Continental drift hypothesis fate too.  accumulated even more evidence, but he prudently introduced them as geopoetry, quote: "Little of  brilliant summary remains pertinent when confronted by the relatively small but crucial amount of information collected in the intervening years. Like Umbgrove, I shall consider this paper an essay in geopoetry."
 The IAV/ IAVEI board (i.e., B.G. Escher and A. Rittmann) probably never dumped the idea that the South Atlantic is under extension.
 And the anti-drifters were in a way right as well. Although convection would mix up the mantle and make it homogeneous. The seafloor cycle with subduction and upwelling is something between conduction and convection, it allows for its inhomogeneity in a quasi-steady state. The mantle and the continents are in a way passive, the heat sink of the earth is the seafloor. So that the heat generated in the earth gets neutralised.

Wegener's continental drift hypotheses is a logical consequence of: the theory of thrusting (alpine geology), the isostasy, the continents forms resulting from the supercontinent Gondwana break up, the past and present-day life forms on both sides of the Gondwana continent margins, and the Permo-Carboniferous moraine deposits in South Gondwana.

Graphics

See also

References

Notes

Cited books 

 
 P.M.S. Blackett, E.C. Bullard and S.K. Runcorn (ed). A Symposium on Continental Drift, held on 28 October 1965. pp. 323:
 
 
 
  Expanding Earth from pp. 311–349.
 
 
 
 
 
 
 
 
 
 
 
 
 
 
 
 
 
 
 
 
 
 
 
 
  Wegener pp. 72–75.

Cited articles 

 
 
 
 
 
 
 
 
 
 
 
 
 
 
 
 
 
 
 
 
 
 
 
 
 
 
 
 
 
 
 
 
 
 
 
 
 
 
 
 
 
 
 
 
 
 
 
 
  
 
 
 
 
 
 
 
 
 
 
 
 
 
 
 
 
 
 
 
 
 
 
 
 
 
 
  Review of Allan Krill, Fixists vs. Mobilists in the Geology Contest of the Century, 1844–1969.
 
 
 
 
 
 
 
 
 
 
 
 
 
 
 
 
 
 
 
 
 
 
 
 
  Just an overview of the article in Petermanns Geographische Mitteilungen. 
 
 
  He gives reasons for the paleo connection of the Americas and Eurasia-Africa by naming paleontological similarities, parallelism of coastal forms and the recently researched submarine Atlantic mountain range as ideal seam of continental splits (p. 181).

Further reading 
 
 
 
 

Plate tectonics
History of Earth science
Geology timelines
20th century in science
21st century in science